Kevin William Mooney (born 23 August 1959) is an English footballer who played as a defender in the Football League for Tranmere Rovers. He had previously played for Bangor City, Bury and Telford United.

In 2017, Mooney was part of a successful campaign with the England team to win the Seniors World Cup in Thailand. This was his sixth World Cup appearance and third time of winning the Seniors World Cup for England.

References

1959 births
Living people
Footballers from Liverpool
English footballers
English Football League players
Association football defenders
Bangor City F.C. players
Bury F.C. players
Telford United F.C. players
Tranmere Rovers F.C. players
Stafford Rangers F.C. players